Ormu is an Austronesian language spoken in Jayapura Bay in Papua province, Indonesia.

References

Languages of western New Guinea
Sarmi–Jayapura languages